The Theater Battle Management Core Systems (TBMCS) is a set of software systems used by all air wings of the United States military to plan and execute military missions utilizing airborne resources, maintain automated airspace deconfliction, and allow inter-service communication. There are multiple configurations of the servers and clients depending on the situation. It has two levels of control, at the larger 'force' level, or at the detailed 'unit' level.  It is used to generate the Air Tasking Order (ATO) and the Airspace Control Order (ACO).  It replaced the Contingency Theater Automated Planning System (CTAPS).  It has many electronic interfaces to other systems, many which are based on USMTF information exchanges.

See also
 Air Operations Center
 Air Combat Command
 Global Command and Control System
 Global Cyberspace Integration Center

References
 Federation of American Scientists
 Lockheed Martin whitepaper 

Military communications
United States Air Force